Andrew Rutherford  (23 July 1929 – 13 January 1998) was a Scottish scholar and university administrator. He was Vice-Chancellor of the University of London from 1994-1997.

Early life
He was born in Helmsdale, Sutherland, Scotland and educated at the local school. He then attended George Watson's College in Edinburgh and then the University of Edinburgh where he read English, graduating in 1951 with first class honours.

He did National Service with the Seaforth Highlanders from 1951 to 1953.

Career
After BLitt studies at Merton College, Oxford, from 1953 to 1955, he was appointed assistant lecturer (1955) and then lecturer (1956) in English at the University of Edinburgh. In 1964 he joined the University of Aberdeen as senior lecturer progressing to Professor of English from 1965 to 1968. He then became Regius Professor of English Literature from 1968 to 1984, also holding various other administrative positions. He became Warden of Goldsmiths, University of London from 1984 to 1992 and Professor (Emeritus) from 1988 to 1992. He was Vice-Chancellor of the University from 1994 to 1997.

Personal life
In 1953 he married Nancy Milroy Browning; they had two sons and a daughter. He died in Edinburgh.  He was appointed CBE in 1993

See also
 List of Vice-Chancellors of the University of London

Bibliography
 Byron, A Critical Study (1961) Oliver & Boyd  
 Byron: the Critical Heritage (1970) Routledge & Kegan Paul PLC  
The Literature of War: Studies in Heroic Virtue (1978) Macmillan Press 
 Byron: Augustan and Romantic (1990)

References

1929 births
1998 deaths
People educated at George Watson's College
Alumni of the University of Edinburgh
Academics of the University of Edinburgh
Vice-Chancellors of the University of London
People associated with Goldsmiths, University of London
Academics of the University of Aberdeen
Commanders of the Order of the British Empire
People from Helmsdale
Alumni of Merton College, Oxford